The Texas State Guard Meritorious Service Ribbon is the ninth highest military decoration that may be conferred to a service member of the Texas Military Forces. Subsequent decorations are denoted by a bronze or silver twig of four oak leaves with three acorns on the stem device.

Eligibility
The Texas State Guard Meritorious Service Ribbon is conferred to any service member of the Texas State Guard, who while serving in any capacity shall distinguish themselves by meritorious service or achievement, but of a lesser degree than required for a higher decoration. The service or achievement shall be such that it clearly sets them above their peers and above what is to be normally expected,

Authority
Unknown

Description

Ribbon 
Texas State Guard Meritorious Service Ribbon is a service ribbon consisting of 4 alternating colors of red, green, blue, and yellow in varying width stripes.

Device 
A bronze twig of four oak leaves with three acorns on the stem device, ¼ of an inch in length, is conferred for second and succeeding decorations. A silver leaf is worn in lieu of five bronze leaves. Silver leaves are worn to the wearer's right of a bronze leaf.

Notable Recipients

See also 

 Awards and decorations of the Texas Military
 Awards and decorations of the Texas government

 Texas Military Forces
 Texas Military Department
List of conflicts involving the Texas Military

External links
Texas State Guard Meritorious Service Ribbon

References 
Texas

Texas Military Department
Texas Military Forces